Johann Gebhard Ehrenreich Maass (February 26, 1766 – December 23, 1823) was a German psychologist.

Maass was born in 1766 in Krottendorf near Halberstadt. In 1791 he became an extraordinary professor of philosophy, and in 1798 a full professor. Among his writings on psychology are Versuche: Über die Einbildungskraft (1792; 2nd ed. 1797), Über die Leidenschaften (1805–1807), and Über die Gefühle und Affekte (1811). He died in Halle in 1823.

Publications

Über die Einbildungskraft (Halle 1792, 2nd ed. 1797), 
Über die Leidenschaften (Halle 1805–1807, 2 vols.), 
Über die Gefühle und Affekte (Halle 1811)
Grundriß der Rhetorik
Grundriß der reinen Mathematik
Grundriß des Naturrechts (Leipzig 1808)
Ueber Rechte und Verbindlichkeiten überhaupt und die bürgerlichen insbesondere (Halle 1794)
Sinnverwandte Wörter zur Ergänzung der Eberhardischen Synonymik
Versuch einer allgemeinen teutschen Synonymik in einem kritisch-philosophischen Wörterbuche der sinnverwandten Wörter der hochdeutschen Mundart. Von Johann August Eberhard und Johann Gebhard Ehrenreich Maaß. (Halle 1826, 3rd ed.)
Handbuch zur Vergleichung und richtigen Anwendung der sinnverwandten Wörter der deutschen Sprache: 3 vols.
Ueber die Aehnlichkeit der christlichen mit der neuesten philosophischen Sittenlehre
Merkwürdige Thatsachen aus Bonaparte's neuester Geschichte
Kritische Theorie der Offenbarung

Philosophical articles:

References
 Peter Bernhard: The Remarkable Diagrams of Johann Maass. In: Günter Löffladt (Ed.): Mathematik – Logik – Philosophie. Ideen und ihre historischen Wechselwirkungen, Harri Deutsch, Frankfurt am Main 2012, ISBN 978-3-8171-1888-5, S. 83–92.
 

1766 births
1823 deaths
German psychologists